Dunbar is an unincorporated community in Washington County, in the U.S. state of Ohio.

History
A post office called Dunbar was established in 1857, and remained in operation until 1917. The community was named for the local Dunbar family. Shelton Dunbar served as an early postmaster.

References

Unincorporated communities in Washington County, Ohio
1857 establishments in Ohio
Populated places established in 1857
Unincorporated communities in Ohio